The Škoda 100 and Škoda 110 were two variations of a rear-engined, rear-wheel drive compact car that was produced by Czechoslovakian automaker AZNP in Mladá Boleslav from 1969 to 1977. They were the successors for the Škoda 1000 MB and Škoda 1100 MB. With a total of 1,079,798 units produced in their eight-year production run, the Škoda 100/110 series was the first Škoda car to exceed a million in production figures. Engine sizes were 1.0 litre (Škoda 100) and 1.1 litre (Škoda 110) respectively. The derived Škoda 110 R coupé (1970–1980), was styled similarly to the Porsche of the time, but with a much lower price and performance. The sporty 120 S and the 130 RS were Sport/Rallye cars, produced in small numbers.

Production figures

Cultural references

In the 1988 film The Unbearable Lightness of Being, protagonist Tomas drives an S 100. As the action takes place against the backdrop of the Prague Spring of 1968 and its violent aftermath, the use of a car that only entered production a year later is unintentionally anachronistic.

The Škoda 100 is the vehicle driven by the protagonist in Ivan Mládek's 1978 single Jožin z bažin.

Gallery

References

External links 

  Iivo's Škoda Page
 Škoda Tech Web 

0100
Cars powered by rear-mounted 4-cylinder engines
1970s cars
Cars introduced in 1969
Rally cars